Troy Black (born 1983) is an Australian Martial arts Coach.

Black was recruited by the Australian Institute of Sport at age eight, and went on to be one of the most successful, influential and charismatic figures in Australian martial arts, appearing in magazines, TV shows and the Life: Be In It advertisement series.

At the age of eighteen, Black represented South Africa in the International Karate Championships, becoming the youngest person ever to win a first place in any senior division.

He is currently a coach with the Australian National Martial Arts team.

References

1983 births
Living people
Australian male karateka